El Ángel de la Seguridad Social (or The Social Security Angel) is an outdoor 2013 bronze sculpture by Jorge Marín, installed along Mexico City's Paseo de la Reforma, in Mexico. It commemorates the creation of the Mexican Social Security Institute.

See also
 2013 in art
 El Vigilante, a similar sculpture by Marín

References

External links

 

2013 establishments in Mexico
2013 sculptures
Bronze sculptures in Mexico
Outdoor sculptures in Mexico City
Paseo de la Reforma
Sculptures of angels
Statues in Mexico City